Henry Hatton Gird III was born 29 May 1801, in New York City. When H. H. Gird III was Seventeen he was appointed a cadet at West Point Academy. He graduated as a Second Lieutenant at the age of 22, after which he worked as a tutor. He married Sarah Ann Kinsley and had 6 children. He married a second time, this time to Elizabeth Lewis Wheeler and had three children together. He was then sent to New Orleans with another Lieutenant to survey the harbor. His family soon followed. 

After he resigned from the Army he became the second President of the College of Louisiana in 1829 and resigned in 1833. He was also a Professor of Mathematics at the same college. One year after H. H. Gird III resigned from the College of Louisiana he accepted a position at the New Orleans Mint. He later died of Yellow Fever.

References

1801 births
1845 deaths
Centenary College of Louisiana faculty
United States Military Academy alumni